Manhandled is the title of two films:

 Manhandled (1924 film), a silent drama starring Gloria Swanson
 Manhandled (1949 film), a film noir featuring Dorothy Lamour, Dan Duryea, and Sterling Hayden